Dr. Vijay Anand Reddy (born 20 October 1959) is an Indian oncologist known for his contributions to the field of cancer. He serves as the director and senior consultant oncologist at Apollo Cancer Hospital, Hyderabad. He also served as the President of Association of Radiation Oncologists of India & Chairman of Indian College of Radiation Oncology.

Life and career
Reddy was born in the Hyderabad city in Telangana state. He graduated in medicine (MBBS) from the Osmania Medical College, Hyderabad in 1982. His master's degree was also obtained from the same institution in 1992. He also secured a DNB in Radiation Oncology National Board of Examinations, New Delhi.

He also served as a consultant ocular oncologist at the L.V. Prasad Eye Institute from 1998. In 2002, he was appointed as the director & senior consultant at Apollo Cancer Hospital, Hyderabad. In 2003 he founded CURE foundation for the poor so they could avail the best of cancer care.

He has served as a member on numerous prestigious committees and bodies, including the American Society of Clinical Oncology, American Society for Radiation Oncology, European Society of Medical Oncology, Union for International Cancer Control, Indian Society of Oncology and others. He has also received international fellowships from Clinical Oncology Fellowship of the Meyerstein Institute of Clinical Oncology, London; Nargis Dutt Memorial Cancer Foundation Fellowship of the New York Hospital, New York; Ocular Oncology Fellowship at Wills Eye Hospital and Children's Hospital, Philadelphia, and, Head and Neck Oncology Fellowship at Peter McCallum Cancer Institute, Melbourne.

Honors and achievements
International Cancer Research Technology Award from UICC, Geneva, Switzerland
Nargis Dutt Memorial Foundation Award
INTERNATIONAL CANCER RESEARCH TECHNOLOGY TRANSFER AWARD” Awarded in 1992 by UICC, Geneva, Switzerland
Best Scientific Paper award of the National Conference of Oncologists of India in 1996
Young Scientist award from Indo-American Cancer Congress in 1966
International Cancer Research Technology Transfer Award of the UICC in 1998 from UICC
2001 Young Investigators’ Award from Eli Lilly & Company, USA.
BEST POSTER award of the American Academy of Ophthalmology in 2008
The Legend in the Field of Oncology” at the Times Healthcare Achievers Awards function at HICC, Hyderabad on 28th Feb’ 2017
AOS achievement award from American Academy of Ophthalmology in January 2018

Selected bibliography

References

External links
 Official Website

1959 births
Indian oncologists
Living people
Telugu people
Medical doctors from Telangana
People from Mahbubnagar district